Hayley Sings Japanese Songs is an album by Christchurch, New Zealand soprano Hayley Westenra. The album contains Westenra's interpretations of traditional and popular contemporary Japanese songs. Some of the songs have been translated into English while others were kept in Japanese.

The album contains the Japanese version of Amazing Grace and is a duet between Hayley and the late Japanese singer Minako Honda. The song was released as a single in Japan and topped the Japanese International Singles Chart.

The album debuted at number 12 on the Japanese Albums Chart, but broke into the Top 10 in its second week of release.

Track listing

Release history

Charts

References

External links
 Official Site
 Amazon

2008 albums
Hayley Westenra albums